Alexandre Tadeu Gallo (born 29 May 1967), known as Alexandre Gallo or just Gallo, is a Brazilian football coach and former player who played as a defensive midfielder. He is the current head coach of Londrina.

Career 
Gallo started his career as a player in Botafogo-SP (city of Ribeirão Preto, state of São Paulo), in 1986. He played for several clubs like Vitória, Santos, São Paulo, Botafogo and Atlético Mineiro, and ended his career playing for  Corinthians, in 2001.

Coaching career 
After his retirement as a player, he became assistant-coach, working with coach Carlos Alberto Parreira  in Corinthians, in 2002.  Also, he worked as assistant-coach with Darío Pereyra in Grêmio in 2003 and with Wanderlei Luxemburgo in Santos in 2004.

In 2004, he started his career as head-coach with the club Villa Nova. Still in 2004 he was invited by the famous Brazilian coach Vanderlei Luxemburgo to work with him as assistant-coach in Santos club; winning together the title of Brazilian Championship.

At the beginning of 2005, he was invited to coach Portuguesa club during São Paulo State League. Due to an excellent work with Portuguesa de Desportos, soon after coach Vanderlei Luxemburgo  was assigned as Real Madrid's coach in the second half of the 2004/2005 season, Gallo was invited to take over Santos club as head-coach.

Since then, Gallo has been Head-Coach, leading many great clubs like Portuguesa de Desportos, Santos, FC Tokyo e Sport.

Gallo coached the big Brazilian club Internacional in 20 games and conquered the Recopa Sudamericana (SouthAmerican Re-Cup 2007) during Brazilian Championship, when he moved to Figueirense. On 5 September 2009 Esporte Clube Santo André, officials dismissed him after seven games with no wins.

Honours

As a player
São Paulo
 Campeonato Paulista: 1998

Atlético Mineiro
 Campeonato Mineiro: 1999, 2000

Corinthians
 Campeonato Paulista: 2001

As a manager
Sport
 Campeonato Pernambucano: 2007

Internacional
 Recopa Sudamericana: 2007

Figueirense
 Campeonato Catarinense: 2008

São Caetano
 Campeonato Paulista Série A2: 2020

Brazil U20
 L'Alcúdia International Football Tournament: 2014
 Panda Cup: 2014

Brazil Olympic Team
 Valais Youth Cup: 2013
 Toulon Tournament: 2013, 2014

References

External links

1967 births
Living people
People from Ribeirão Preto
Brazilian footballers
Brazilian football managers
Association football midfielders
Brazilian people of Italian descent
Brazilian expatriate football managers
Expatriate football managers in Japan
Expatriate football managers in the United Arab Emirates
Campeonato Brasileiro Série A players
Campeonato Brasileiro Série A managers
Campeonato Brasileiro Série B managers
J1 League managers
Botafogo Futebol Clube (SP) players
Esporte Clube Vitória players
Santos FC players
Associação Portuguesa de Desportos players
Guarani FC players
São Paulo FC players
Botafogo de Futebol e Regatas players
Clube Atlético Mineiro players
Sport Club Corinthians Paulista players
Villa Nova Atlético Clube managers
Associação Portuguesa de Desportos managers
Santos FC managers
FC Tokyo managers
Sport Club do Recife managers
Sport Club Internacional managers
Figueirense FC managers
Clube Atlético Mineiro managers
Esporte Clube Bahia managers
Esporte Clube Santo André managers
Clube Náutico Capibaribe managers
Al Ain FC managers
Avaí FC managers
Brazil national under-20 football team managers
Brazil national under-17 football team managers
Al-Qadisiyah FC managers
Associação Atlética Ponte Preta managers
Esporte Clube Vitória managers
Associação Desportiva São Caetano managers
Botafogo Futebol Clube (SP) managers
Santa Cruz Futebol Clube managers
Footballers from São Paulo (state)
Cianorte Futebol Clube managers
Londrina Esporte Clube managers